Wargasm (stylised as 𝐖𝐀𝐑𝐆𝐀𝐒𝐌) are a British electronic rock duo from London. Formed in 2018 by musician Sam Matlock and model Milkie Way, they have released 11 solo singles including "Spit." which has gained 5 million streams on Spotify, and over 400 thousand views on YouTube. Alternative Press listed them as a defining part of the 2020s wave of nu metal, and NME listed them as one of 2021's essential emerging artists. The pair also took home "Best UK Breakthrough" at The Heavy Music Awards in 2021 and have received widespread acclaim from Kerrang! and Revolver. Their debut full-length release, Explicit: The Mixxxtape, was released on September 9, 2022.

History
Sam Matlock and Milkie Way first met when Way was working as a concert photographer, and photographed Matlock's previous band Dead!. After the 2018 disbandment of Dead!, Matlock approached Way, who was working as a model in Tokyo at the time, to begin a new project. This led to the formation of Wargasm, taking their name from the L7 song of the same name. At first the pair began writing pop punk songs, however by the time their debut single "Post Modern Rhapsody" was released on 22 August 2019, they had departed from this sound. They played their first live performance the following week. On 6 November, they released the single "God Of War".

On 20 February 2020, they released the single "Gold Gold Gold". The following day, they released a cover of "Lapdance" by N.E.R.D. On 5 June they released the single "Spit". On 3 September it was announced that their song "God of War" would be used as the theme for NXT UK. On 26 September, they released the single "Backyard Bastards", a music video was then released for the song on 5 October. On 14 November, they released the single "Rage All Over". During the COVID-19 pandemic, Way took charge as fellow musician Yungblud's guitarist, filling in for Adam Warrington.

On 23 April 2021, they released the single "Your Patron Saints". On 14 June, they released the single "Pyro Pyro". On 19 June, they performed at the 2021 Download Festival Pilot. On 20 August, they released the single "Salma Hayek". On the same day, Kerrang! released a video of them performing for their K! Pit live series. On 27 August, they performed at the 2021 Reading and Leeds Festivals on Friday and Saturday respectively. On 30 August, they performed at ALT+LDN festival. They were featured on Death Blooms' single "Shut Up", which was released on 31 August 2021. Their debut UK headline tour will take place between 17 and 24 November 2021. Following the band's performance at Scala on 5 November 2021, band member Sam Matlock was allegedly assaulted by security staff. A complaint was filed with Security Industry Authority. The band has indicated they no longer consider the club a safe venue, especially for women.

On 7 January 2022, Wargasm announced they will be supporting fellow UK band Neck Deep’s 2022 UK tour. On 16 March 2022, Wargasm announced they will be supporting Limp Bizkit on their North American "Still Sucks" tour. On 6 May 2022, Matlock and Way announced that Wargasm had signed to slowplay and Republic Records, and would be releasing their debut full-length release - Explicit: The Mixxxtape - that coming summer. The lead single, "D.R.I.L.D.O.", was initially announced for Friday, 13 May, but was pushed back a week for unknown reasons. This full-length release then enabled them to go on tour across the United Kingdom playing shows in cities such as London, Belfast and Dublin, most notably their show at the O2 Forum Kentish Town, which is their biggest headline show to date. These shows then contributed to the music video for their song "Super Fiend" released on December 12, 2022, using shots of the crowd and live performances on stage for scenes in the video. On Christmas Day 2022, the duo released a cover of the Girls Aloud song "Something Kinda Oooh" for Amazon Music.

Musical style and influences
Critics have categorised the band's music as electro-punk, post-hardcore and nu metal. Their music makes use of elements of riot grrrl, heavy metal, dubstep, screamo, pop, electronic and hip hop music. NME writer Ali Shutler described their music "cyberpunk". Their music often makes use of screamed vocals, electronic and psychedelic sounds, aggressive guitar riffs, and distorted bass. Songs often feature Matlock and Way trading off vocals duties mid verse.

Alternative Press writer Giedrė Matulaitytė described their music as an "eclectic blend of punk/riot grrrl attitude, hardcore energy, grunge pessimism and murky nü-metal groove", and Ali Cooper described them as "If you take all the limitless energy of a pulsing nightclub and throw it into the pit". Metal Hammer writer Yasmine Summan described it as "catchy nu metal riffs, throw in a bit of riot grrrl flare and wash it down with a healthy dosage of post-apocalyptic angst" and Jack Saunders described them as "the Prodigy and Slipknot at the same time."

They have cited influences including L7, Limp Bizkit, Loathe, SHVPES and Poppy. When asked on an interview with Fred Perry clothing what songs' lyrics inspired them, Matlock answered "Custer" by Slipknot and Way answered "Smack A B*tch - Remix" by Rico Nasty.

Members
Milkie Way – vocals, bass
Sam Matlock – vocals, guitar

Live members
Edison Hunter – guitar (2019–present)
Adam Breeze – drums (2019–present)
Ryan Cornall – drums (2019–2021)

Discography

Albums
Explicit: The Mixxxtape (2022)

Singles

As a featured artist

Accolades

References

Musical groups established in 2018
English electronic rock musical groups
English musical duos
Electropunk musical groups
English punk rock groups
British nu metal musical groups
British post-hardcore musical groups
Musical groups from London
Rock music duos
Female-fronted musical groups